Tetuán is a barrio in the municipality of Utuado, Puerto Rico. Its population in 2010 was 680.

History
Puerto Rico was ceded by Spain in the aftermath of the Spanish–American War under the terms of the Treaty of Paris of 1898 and became an unincorporated territory of the United States. In 1899, the United States Department of War conducted a census of Puerto Rico finding that the population of Tetuán barrio was 1,678.

Landslide
On May 28, 2019 a landslide occurred in Tetuán cutting off many families' access to the main road, Puerto Rico Highway 140. The mayor said landslides are a normal occurrence in the Utuado municipality.

See also

 List of communities in Puerto Rico

References

Barrios of Utuado, Puerto Rico